The 'Chok Anan' mango, sometimes spelled Chocanon, is a sweet mango from Thailand, India, Bangladesh and Pakistan. It has an oval shape and tapered tips. The ripe fruit and flesh are light yellow and have a sweet taste. Chok Anan is also called a "honey mango".

Gallery

References 

Mango cultivars
Thai cuisine
Fruits originating in Asia